Uddhav Thapa (Nepali: उद्धव थापा) is a Nepalese politician and member of the Bagmati Provincial Assembly. He was elected parliamentary party leader of Rastriya Prajatantra Party in the Bagmati Provincial Assembly. He had previously served as Minister for Water, Energy and Irrigation of Bagmati Province from (10 January 2023 – 25 February 2023).

References

Year of birth missing (living people)
Living people
21st-century Nepalese politicians
Rastriya Prajatantra Party politicians
Place of birth missing (living people)